Ian Tullett (born 15 August 1969) is a male English former pole vaulter. He is now a teacher at Hall Grove School, Surrey (as of 2021), as a sport staff.

Athletics career
Tullett represented England and won a silver medal at the 1990 Commonwealth Games in Auckland, New Zealand, behind Australia's Simon Arkell. Eight years later he represented England in the pole vault event, at the 1998 Commonwealth Games in Kuala Lumpur, Malaysia.

Personal life
He married Welsh runner Hayley Tullett (née Parry) in 1999.

References

1969 births
Living people
English male pole vaulters
Athletes (track and field) at the 1990 Commonwealth Games
Athletes (track and field) at the 1998 Commonwealth Games
Commonwealth Games silver medallists for England
Commonwealth Games medallists in athletics
Medallists at the 1990 Commonwealth Games